Gambia–Taiwan relations refers to the historical relationship between Gambia and Republic of China (ROC). Gambia officially recognized Taiwan in 1996 and the People's Republic of China ended recognition for Gambia. On 14 November 2013, Gambian President Yahya Jammeh announced the breaking of diplomatic ties with Taiwan. ROC President Ma Ying-jeou officially terminated ties with Gambia on 18 November 2013 as a response.

Aid
In December 2010, Taiwan donated $300,000 to aid Gambia's health sector.

On 27 August 2013, the Taiwanese government donated a total sum of US$1,158,875.5 in order to provide support for two projects. The first sum of US$692,983.5 would be used to fulfill the requirements and the implementation of the phase three of the Old Police Line Quarters rehabilitation project. The remaining US$465,892 were assigned for scholarships and tuition fees for six Gambians students to study Aeronautical Engineering and maintenance skills at Spartan College of Aeronautics and Technology, USA.

Ambassadors

ROC ambassadors to the Gambia
 Edgar Lin (August 2001 – December 2004)

See also
 Foreign relations of Taiwan
 Foreign relations of the Gambia

References

1996 establishments
2013 disestablishments
The Gambia–Taiwan relations